Clarence Holbrook Carter (March 26, 1904 – June 4, 2000) born in Portsmouth, Ohio, was an American artist.

Education
Carter studied at the Cleveland School of Art from 1923 to 1927, and earned key patronage from William Millikin, the director of the Cleveland Museum of Art. Millikin arranged for Carter study in Italy with Hans Hofmann in Capri, Italy, for the summer of 1927.

Career
Throughout the 1930s and 40s he was known for his paintings of rural America and the burden brought on by the Great Depression.  By the end of World War II he had adopted a more surrealist approach to painting. In 1949, he was elected into the National Academy of Design as an Associate member, and became a full member in 1964.

Collected works
Carter's work is found in the collections of the Whitney Museum of American Art; the Museum of Fine Arts, Boston; the Hirshhorn Museum and Sculpture Garden, Washington D.C.; the James A. Michener Art Museum; the Cleveland Museum of Art; the Smithsonian American Art Museum, Washington D.C.; the Carnegie Museum of Art, Pittsburgh, PA; the Yager Museum of Art & Culture, Oneonta, New York; and many others.

See also
Bodley Gallery
Hans Hofmann

References

Carter, Clarence Holbrook; James A. Michener;  Gimpel & Weitzenhoffer (New York, N.Y.);  Bodley Gallery (New York, N.Y.) Clarence Carter : a joint exhibition 30 April through 1 June, 1974 Gimpel & Weitzenhiffer Gallery ... and Bodley Gallery (New York : Gimpel & Weitzenhoffer) OCLC: 6540063
Trapp, Frank;  Douglas Dreishpoon;  Ricardo Pau-Llosa. Clarence Holbrook Carter (New York : Rizzoli, ©1989)

External links
Askart.com pages on Clarence Holbrook Carter (includes several color images)
Clarence Holbrook Carter Online (artcyclopedia.com)
color image and discussion of a Clarence Carter painting (War Bride, 1940; Carnegie Museum of Art, Pittsburgh, PA)
Bio of Carter at the Michener Museum website

1904 births
2000 deaths
20th-century American painters
American male painters
American illustrators
People from Portsmouth, Ohio
Painters from Ohio
National Academy of Design members
Section of Painting and Sculpture artists
American muralists
Cleveland School of Art alumni
20th-century American male artists